Huracán Fútbol Club, usually known simply as Huracán and sometimes called as Huracán del Paso de la Arena, is a Uruguayan football club based in Montevideo. It was founded in 1954.

History
Huracán Fútbol Club was founded on August 1, 1954 through the merger of two clubs composed mainly of young students: the "Club Atlético Charrúa" and "La Esquinita Football Club". The new team's name was inspired by a former club "Huracán" that participated in Uruguayan leagues during the early 20th century. Colors adopted from Club Nacional de Football, because the founders were fans of this Uruguayan giant.

Club was affiliated to the AUF in 1962. Their highest performance was in 1991, when Huracán fought for promotion to Uruguayan Primera División. However, in the final game at home they lost 0:4 to Liverpool, while their opponents River Plate won in La Paz against Oriental, achieving promotion.

In 2010, Huracán achieved promotion from Segunda División Amateur (third level) and returns to the Professional Second Division of Uruguay.

From May to August 2011, Huracán merged with Club Atlético Torque and named Huracán Torque, but later this merge was dissolved. Huracán Torque never played in official games.

Titles
 Segunda División Amateur de Uruguay (3): 1983, 1990, 2009/10
 Primera "D" (Uruguay) (1): 1978

References

External links

Official site of Huracán Fútbol Club (Montevideo)

Football clubs in Uruguay
Association football clubs established in 1954
Sport in Montevideo
1954 establishments in Uruguay